Rosenbach's sign may refer to any of the clinical signs described by Dr. Ottomar Rosenbach.
 Rosenbach's sign (liver), systolic pulsations of the liver in aortic regurgitation
 Rosenbach's sign (eye), tremor of the eyelids in Grave's disease
 Rosenbach's sign (hemiplegia), absence of the abdominal wall skin reflex when stroking the skin of the abdomen on the paralyzed side in cerebral hemiplegia.

References

Medical signs